Instrumentally Yours is a studio album released by guitarist Grady Martin in 1965 on Decca LP record DL 74610 (stereo) and DL 4610 (mono). The album was also issued, in truncated format, on a 7-inch "Little LP" mini-album for Seeburg jukeboxes.  Included is a version of "El Paso", for which Martin had provided distinctive guitar for Marty Robbins' hit.

Track listing

Side one
"El Paso"1 (Marty Robbins) – 2:36
"Theme from Malamondo ("Funny World")" (Ennio Morricone) – 2:21
"The Girl from Ipanema" (Antonio Carlos Jobim - Vinicius de Moras) – 2:48
"All Alone Am I" (Manos Hadjidakis - Arthur Altman) – 2:32
"Ramona"1 (Mabel Wayne - Louis Wolfe Gilbert) – 2:40
"Ruby" (Heinz Roemhild - Mitchell Parish) – 2:45

Side two
"Ring of Fire"1 (June Carter - Merle Kilgore)  – 2:32
"Where Have All the Flowers Gone?" (Pete Seeger) – 2:15
"Near You" (Francis Craig - Kermit Goell) – 2:23
"Devil Woman"1 (Marty Robbins) – 2:30
"Forever"1 (Buddy Killen) – 2:27
"On the Rebound"1 (Floyd Cramer) – 2:04

(1) contained on Seeburg Little LP

References

1965 albums
Decca Records albums
Instrumental albums